Nyabarongo I Hydroelectric Power Station is a  hydroelectric power station in Rwanda.

Location
The power station is located across the Nyabarongo River, near the settlement of Mushishiro, Muhanga District, in Rwanda's Southern Province.

Overview
Nyabarongo I Power Station is a hydropower plant in Rwanda, completed in October 2014, with a commissioning date in November 2014. At an estimated cost of US$110 million, the planned capacity installation is 28 MW. The project involves a dam, with run of river design, across the River Mwogo, one of the tributaries of Nyabarongo River. The project, undertaken by Angelique International Limited and Bharat Heavy Electricals Limited of India, is the largest hydropower installation in Rwanda, to date. Naresh Kapoor Sr., General Manager is the Chief Project Officer appointed by Angelique International Limited of India. Part of the engineering work was also subcontracted to the Australian company Snowy Mountains Engineering Corporation (SMEC). Both the units were synchronised to the Rwandan grid on 27 October 2014 and 30 October 2014. The Rwanda government gave the contractor a deadline in October 2014. The power station was completed and handed over by consortium to client on 28 November 2014. It was officially inaugurated by the president of Rwanda on 5 March 2015.

Other considerations
 Material handling, etc. of complete E&M package of 2x14 MW Vertical Francis Hydro Generating Units at Nyaborongo HEP, Republic of Rwanda, Africa package carried out by FITWELL Power Projects an Indian company as sub-contractor  of  BHEL.

See also

List of power stations in Rwanda
List of hydropower stations in Africa
List of hydroelectric power stations
Gisenyi

References

External links
  Location of Nyabarongo Power Station At Google Maps

Hydroelectric power stations in Rwanda
Dams in Rwanda
Muhanga District
Southern Province, Rwanda
Energy infrastructure completed in 2014
2014 establishments in Rwanda